Marija Nikolić (born 11 April 1975), better known as Maja Nikolić, is a Serbian singer and reality television personality. Born and raised in Niš, she pursued a singing career in the early 90s by competing in music festivals. Nikolić has released six studio albums.

Additionally, she has appeared on numerous reality shows, including Farma (2009, 2015), Dvor (2011) and Veliki Brat VIP (2013).

Career in music
In February 1994, Nikolić rose to prominence by competing on the International Music Fair (MESAM) in Belgrade with "Odlazi", winning three first prizes. The following year, she released her debut album Sad me pronađi under PGP-RTS. Nikolić has cited singer Maja Odžaklijevska as her musical influence and supporter during her beginnings. In May 1998, she participated on the Slavianski Bazar in Odessa, Ukraine and Saratov, Russia where she sung "Više nisi moj" and "Đelem, Đelem", arranged by her frequent collaborator Vladimir Graić and Željko Joksimović. As the winner, Nikolić performed at the Red Square. Also in 1998, she released her second album Uzmi me, which was promoted with her first solo concert in Sava Centar, held in February 1999.

Following her third album Iz inata, released in 2000, Nikolić left Serbia and moved to the United States where she performed at Harry's Velvet Room in downtown Chicago, Illinois. She also served as the opening act at Diana Ross' charity concert for disabled children at the China Club in New York City. Nikolić also performed "Something To Talk About" from the 2002 movie About A Boy at the 7th Golden Satellite Awards.

In addition to her recording career, Nikolić's singing has been a subject of viral internet memes, including the one in which she is ridiculed for her performance of "I Will Survive" from 2013, titled "Maja Sings in a Made-up Language".

Controversies
In March 2011, prosecution filled an investigation procedure against Nikolić and singer Miloš Bojanić for their anti-semitic remarks on the reality show Dvor. The two were subsequently disqualified from the show, but were ultimately in July 2014 acquitted of the charges for hate speech and antisemitism by the Appellate Court in Belgrade.

In December 2012, Nikolić falsely introduced herself as the president of a company called Comandante, which she claimed was supposed to negotiate deals between Metrowagonmash and Serbian Railways. 

Two years later, she also asserted to be the president of a company called Špar, which according to her planned to open 12,000 retail stores across Serbia, offering 120,000 jobs. After media had accused her of trying to plagiarize the multinational franchise SPAR, Nikolić decided to resign in April 2015.

Personal life
Nikolić stated that she graduated from the Svetozar Marković Grammar School in Niš and later attended the Stella Adler Studio of Acting in Los Angeles.

She has two sons from two failed marriages, named Novak ( 1997) and Lazar ( 2006).

Discography
Studio albums
 Sad Me Pronađi (1995)
 Uzmi Me (1998)
 Iz Inata (2000)
 Za Moju Dušu (2006)
 Crveno (2011)
 Zemlja Čuda (2018)

Music festivals

 MESAM (1994) - "Odlazi"
 Beogradsko proleće (1994) - "Napustio si sve"
 Sunčane skale (1994) - "Baš sam se zaljubila"
 Budvanski festival (1994) - "Milion suza"
 MESAM (1996) - "Svaki sam tren tebi suđena"
 Beogradsko proleće (1998) - "Ne traži me više"
 Slavianski Bazar (1998) - "Više nisi moj" and "Đelem, đelem"
 Sunčane skale (1998) - "Varali me svi" 
 Beovizija (2003) - "Granica"
 Zrenjaninski festival (2003) - "Bolesna"
 Golden Satellite (2003) - "Something To Talk About"
 Beovizija (2004) - "Otrov u malim bočicama" (feat. Ceca Slavković)
 Sunčane skale (2005) - "Stoti put"
 Radijski festival (2006) - "Pokloni se"
 Beovizija (2007) - "Ja znam da ti me ne voliš"
 Budvanski festival (2007) - "Delirijum"
 Ohridski festival (2008) - "Samo za tvoje oči"
 Vrnjačka banja (2012) - "Glas"
 Beosong (2013) - Blagoslov"
 Ohridski festival (2017) - "Suvenir"
 Beovizija (2018) - "Zemlja čuda"

Filmography

References

External links 
 
 

1975 births
Living people
Serbian pop singers
21st-century Serbian women singers
Musicians from Niš
Antisemitism in Serbia
20th-century Serbian women singers
Beovizija contestants